Frédérique Vallet-Bisson (29 April 1862 – 1949) was a French painter.

Vallet-Bisson was born in Amiens but moved to Paris, where she became a pupil of Jules-Joseph Lefebvre at the Académie Julian. She showed works at the Paris Salon from 1890 to 1945. She exhibited at Chicago World Exposition in 1893. Vallet-Bisson had a daughter born in 1880, Lucienne Bisson, who was also a painter.

Vallet-Bisson's painting The Departure was included in the 1905 book Women Painters of the World.

References 

Frédérique Vallet-Bisson on artnet

1862 births
1949 deaths
People from Amiens
19th-century French painters
French women painters
Académie Julian alumni
19th-century French women artists
20th-century French painters
20th-century French women artists